Fonky Family or La Fonky Family (often shortened to La Fonky, or La FF), is a French hip hop band from Marseille, consisting of four rappers, Le Rat Luciano,  and Sat, producer , DJ Djel, dancer Blaze, singer Karima, Flex (fetus) Nandell, and manager Fafa.

Fonky Family made their first appearance on the French hip hop scene in 1994, after IAM had paved the way for new hip hop artists originating from Marseille. Their first album, came out in 1997 and soon received a gold album. Karima left the group before the release of the album. 

In 1998, the group were invited to collaborate with Akhenaton on the soundtrack of Luc Besson's film Taxi. The film became a huge success and its soundtrack topped the French charts. After numerous collaborations with different members of IAM on their solo albums, the group released one EP record with six live and edited titles, titled Hors série volume 1, in spring 1999. Hors série volume 2 was released in 2000.

Their second album, Art de rue, came out in 2001. After that, many members of the group chose to pursue solo careers: Le Rat Luciano had already released a solo album in 2000, and Sat and Don Choa followed in 2001 and 2002 respectively. DJ Djel produced two compilations in 2001 and 2003. 

In January 2006, Fonky Family released their third album  (Jive/Sony BMG), which debuted on the French charts straight at number one.

Fonky Family have a global music publishing deal with BMG Music Publishing.

Fonky Family's track "La Furie et la Foi" was used as the soundtrack for French skateboarder J. B. Gillet's part in the film Rodney Vs Daewon Round II.

Lead members

Le Rat Luciano
Le Rat Luciano (real name Christophe Carmona ; born 9 April 1976) is a French rapper from Marseille. His father is of Spanish origin and his mother comes from Martinique. He got noticed as a rapper in 1994 when he was part of the group Fonky Family.

Sat l'Artificier
Sat l'Articier or just Sat born Karim Haddouche in Marseille on September 16, 1975 in Marseille, France), is a French rapper of Algerian origin and is a member of the group Fonky Family. Born to an Algerian father and French mother of Corsican descent, Sat discovered rap at an early age. In 1993, along with his neighborhood friends Le Rat Luciano, Don Choa and Menzo, they created the group Fonky Family. After meeting with IAM's Akhenaton (rapper) they started working on their first album. Since then, the group has released 4 albums and are considered one of the biggest rap groups in France.

Discography

Albums

Live albums

EPs

Others
2001: Si Dieu veut / Art de rue (Peak FR: #89)
2002: Art de rue / Hors Serie Vol. 2 (Peak FR: #135)

Singles

References

External links 
Fonky Family – Official site
Fonky Family at MCM.net
Fonky Family Biography at Radio France International

French hip hop groups
Musical groups from Marseille
Rappers from Bouches-du-Rhône